The 2002–03 Cupa României was the 65th edition of Romania's most prestigious football tournament.

Dinamo București  won the title by defeating Naţional București, 1–0.

Format
Cupa României is an annual knockout tournament. The first round of matches are played on the grounds of the lower-ranked teams; in the second round the matches are played in a neutral location. If a match is tied after 90 minutes, the game goes into extra time. If the match is still tied, the result is decided by penalty kicks. In the quarterfinals and semifinals, the winner was determined by the combined score from two matches.

First round proper

|colspan=3 style="background-color:#97DEFF;"|6 November 2002

|}

Second round proper

|colspan=3 style="background-color:#97DEFF;"|27 November 2002

|}

Quarterfinals 
The matches were played on 12 March and 2 April 2003.

||4–0||1–0
||1–2||0–1
||0–1||2–2
||5–1||0–0
|}

Semifinals
The matches were played on 23 April and 14 May 2003.

||4–0||1–2
||2–1||1–3 (a.e.t.)
|}

Final

References

External links
 romaniansoccer.ro
 Official site
 The Romanian Cup on the FRF's official site

Cupa României seasons
2002–03 in Romanian football
Romania